Annie Get Your Gun was an album, released on February 11, 1963, by Columbia Records, starring Doris Day and Robert Goulet. It consisted of songs from the musical of the same name. The LP was issued on the Columbia Masterworks label in both mono and stereo (catalog numbers OL-5960 and OS-2360 respectively). The album has been reissued on CD by DRG (catalog number 19112).

The album was one of a number of albums produced by Columbia using a format similar to an original cast album of a musical play, but starring vocalists under contract to the company. Other albums in the same series included a John Raitt/Barbara Cook album of Show Boat (released 1962), a John Raitt/Florence Henderson/Phyllis Newman album of Oklahoma! (released 1964), and a Barbara Cook/Theodore Bikel album of The King and I (also released 1964). In this case, Doris Day and Robert Goulet were both major Columbia stars, and this was probably the most important album in this series.

At the time, Day was at the peak of her movie career and could not spare the time to go to the East Coast, where most of the production of this album took place. So she recorded her tracks at Columbia Records' Los Angeles studios and the tapes were sent to New York City, where orchestral arrangements were written by Philip J. Lang to fit Day's singing, a procedure rather contrary to normal practice. Goulet and the other singers, in turn, had to fit their keys and tempos to Lang's orchestral arrangements.

Track listing
All songs composed by Irving Berlin

References

1963 albums
Doris Day albums
Columbia Records albums
Robert Goulet albums